Magno Ruiz (born 11 April 1972) is a Guatemalan boxer. He competed in the men's bantamweight event at the 1992 Summer Olympics.

References

1972 births
Living people
Guatemalan male boxers
Olympic boxers of Guatemala
Boxers at the 1992 Summer Olympics
Place of birth missing (living people)
Bantamweight boxers